Gallio   (Cimbrian: Ghèl)  is a town in the province of Vicenza, Veneto, Italy. It is on SP76.  As of 2007 Gallio had an estimated population of 2,454.

The town is home to mountain slopes popular with skiers, and a 70-meter ski jump, which has been used in international ski jumping competitions.

Sources
(Google Maps)

Cities and towns in Veneto